Ma'an Sports Club  is a football club based in Ma'an, Jordan. Founded in 1971, Ma'an first participated in the Jordanian Pro League in 2020.

Players

Current squad

See also 
 List of football clubs in Jordan

References

External links 
 
 Ma'an SC at Kooora.com

Ma'an SC
Football clubs in Jordan
Association football clubs established in 1971
1971 establishments in Jordan